Anthony Marchi (21 January 1933 – 15 March 2022) was an English football player and manager.

Career
Marchi played for Tottenham Hotspur in the position of wing half from 1950 until 1965, which was broken up by a two-year spell in Italy with Vicenza and Torino, both on loan from Juventus. During much of his career at Spurs, Marchi was mostly used as an understudy to Danny Blanchflower and Dave Mackay. However, in 1962–63 following injuries he established himself in the side and was a member of the 1963 UEFA Cup Winners' Cup Final winning team. He was one of seventeen players used by Spurs in their Double winning side of 1960–61. He also later managed Cambridge City and Northampton Town.

Marchi died at the age of 89 on 15 March 2022 in Broomfield Hospital, Chelmsford.

Honours
Tottenham Hotspur
 Football League First Division: 1950–51, 1960–61
 FA Cup: 1960–61, 1961–62
 Football League Second Division: 1949–50
 European Cup Winners' Cup: 1962–63

References

External links
 
 Hugman,B,J (Ed). The PFA Premier & Football League Players' Records 1946-2005 p 412 (2005) 
 European Cup Winners' Cup Final 1963 Marchi standing furthest right in photo

1933 births
2022 deaths
Association football midfielders
English footballers
English football managers
Tottenham Hotspur F.C. players
L.R. Vicenza players
Torino F.C. players
Northampton Town F.C. managers
English people of Italian descent
English expatriate footballers
Expatriate footballers in Italy
Serie A players
Footballers from Edmonton, London
English Football League players
London XI players
Cambridge City F.C. managers
English Football League managers
Juventus F.C. players